Township is a casual farming and city-building game developed and launched on multiple platforms by Playrix in which players develop starter towns by building factories, harvesting crops, and creating goods. The game's main idea is to link one independent agriculture operation into a complete set of industrial chains, increase income, expand the territory, and make your town more prosperous by increasing the population. Township was originally available as an Adobe Flash application on WhatsApp Social and was later released on the App Store, Google Play, Appgallery, Amazon Appstore, Microsoft Store & Mac App Store.

Gameplay
The gameplay is built upon farming and production puzzle cores, and casual order board games. A player starts harvesting crops such as wheat, corn, carrot, potato, sugarcane, cocoa, tomato, rubber, silk, strawberries, rice and pepper. Assets are used to produce goods in factories to earn coins and experience points. At the initial levels, players are assisted by a character named Ernie who gives them brief tutorials. To produce eggs, wool, and bacon, players can farm chickens, sheep, and pigs. The game is in sync with real-time, and rewards for a taken assignment depend on its time to manufacture products. This process can be sped up with in-game currency. There are more than 250 goods to harvest or produce. Production puzzles are driven by orders, which first appear on the helicopter pad.

Leveling up, players get access to new in-game activities and content, like the Mine, the Zoo, and the Port.

The city-building mechanics of Township differs from traditional games of the genre. A layout and planning have an insignificant impact on the outcome that allows players to concentrate mostly on a maintaining aspect. They have access to constructions of different categories — Houses, Community and Farming Buildings, Factories, Decorations, and Special. Community Buildings and Houses have the most significant effect on a town-development strategy. They are needed to increase the population cap, which is necessary for building factories and expanding the territory. Barns set the capacity of all items a player can store and can be upgraded by collecting enough construction materials from trains or by special Barn Upgrade Ticket. Players can design their towns with more than 200 available decorations like plants, yachts, castles.

Outside of a town layout, players can solve integrated mini-games of new casual and hyper-casual challenges. For example, Playrix included time management cooking sims Italian Week or match-three puzzle game Color Splash. The usual event duration is 7–10 days on a non-continuous basis. Each mini-game has its progression loop to motivate players to compete on a leaderboard.

Township encourages interactions between players by joining Co-ops or Clans. Through these, members are able to ask for help with fulfilling orders, donate planes and trains to other players, and take part in regatta races. Later on, developers added chat to boost the social aspect of Township. In addition, players can invite Facebook followers to expand in-game friend lists. As a reward to involved players, the "Daily Bonus" is used, which is awarded after playing for five days in a row.

Train System 
Level 5 unlocks a free train simulation that allows the exchange of goods for construction materials and mining tools. The train has at least three carriages and will leave when the cars are packed. It takes almost 2–5 hours for the train to deliver the materials, and then another train will arrive at the train station waiting to be filled with items. A reward for fulfilling orders is available after the train's return in the form of upgrade or expansion materials. Later on, players can upgrade the train to reduce its travel time.

Farmland is unlocked based on the number of people in a town, and the more people a player has, the more farmland they can build. However there is a cap on the number of people, which can be increased by building community buildings that require materials only received through trains and markets. The difficulty of expanding the city area increases with the level. At first, players only need money to expand the city area, but later need shovels, axes, and saw blades. These items can also only be obtained through the train.

In the middle and later stages of the game, players experience difficulties with available space in the warehouse. The upgrade materials for warehouses, the train, and community buildings, and city expansion materials all take up warehouse space. Additionally, as all activities must be transferred through the warehouse, orders can't be complete if it's full. This requires upgrading the granary with upgrade materials, such as nails, hammers, and paint, although more of each material are required every time it is upgraded. Players can also sell the items in the warehouse at a low price to free up space.

As the player's level increases, they can repair the second and third railroads.

Aircraft System 
Once they reach Level 17, players can repair the airport and use an airplane to earn coins and XP points, filling orders in stipulated time before departure.

Airports require three groups of the same number and type of items, two or three of each, to be ready within 15 hours. Each delivery of a kind of item is rewarded with a batch of gold coins. Each completed group will be rewarded with more, and completing three groups will result in banknotes and gems.

If players do not send out a plane within 15 hours, they will not get most of the rewards. However, players can force a plane to be sent out when the items are incomplete. The interval between planes is five hours.

Ordering System 
The source of the town's development is planting and farming. Crops and various agricultural products are put into multiple factories to be processed into different products. Players get gold and experience value by completing orders for the inhabitants via helicopter. Orders are one of the most direct ways to earn money and need to be delivered by helicopter, so it's recommended to place the helicopter in the city's center. If a player feels they can't complete an order, they can cancel it but it will be at least half a minute before the next one appears.

Orders that have emerged are not limited in time so there may be items in the order that are not available for the player to produce at the time they receive it.

Mine 
At level 21, players can repair the mine where they dig for ores. There are four kinds of ores: copper, silver, gold, and platinum, and every five ores can be made into a metal in the smelter.

There are three tools to dig and destroy rock tiles: pickaxe (destroy a grid), dynamite (destroy a horizontal row), and TNT (destroy a circle around). Mining tools and ore do not take up warehouse space, but the smelter can only do one metal at a time and must take the previous one.

Mine allows extracting precious metals, hidden chests, coins, messages from friends, and other artifacts. Mining also produces resources to level up buildings, which reduces production time and various improvements.

Ship System (Port) 
Using Ships, players can get rare items and treasures. The maximum number of ships is 4, and each ship may carry up to 3 crates.

The first ship is free, the second one 5,000 gold coins, the third one 8,000 gold coins, and the fourth one 25,000 gold coins. Players can order the ship to go to the relevant island to acquire the unproductive materials by paying these fees. There are four islands: Frutus Isle (including peach, watermelon, and plum), Olive Isle (including grape, olive, and key lime), Tropica Isle (including banana, coconut, and pineapple), and Fishermen's Isle (fish, shrimp, and lobster). One ingot of metal can be added to each sailing to get better supplies from the trip.

Zoo 
After the 2015 upgrade, players are given an opportunity to build and run Zoo, which upgrades require assets produced in the city. Unlocking new animals enables additional buildings to the zoo layout (a cafe, souvenir shop, and fast food).

Co-op 
After reaching a certain level, players need to select and join a cooperative where they can meet like-minded people. Players can request supplies or give their supplies to those in need in the co-op.

Periodically, co-op regattas take place. Parties need to complete chosen tasks in a given time to collect points.

Commercial and reception
Township was launched in 2011 as a freemium social game on Google+, and later it was adopted for Facebook. After redesigning, it was also launched on smartphones and became the first mobile game from the developer Playrix — it was released for iOS in 2012 and for Android in 2013. During the first six years, the developers have implemented more than sixty updates. For example, they completely changed the in-game graphics in 2015. In addition, the number of levels increased from maximum of 38 levels to 90. In November 2019, the developers launched an in-game analog of the Season Pass called Professor's Experiments, which resulted in a one-time 22% increase in sales.

By 2016, the mobile game had over a million daily active users only in China.  The number of daily users worldwide exceeded 3.5 million in 2020. The audience was divided roughly equally between iOS and Android devices. By 2021, the game was downloaded more than 248 million times, the developer's profit, excluding the seller's commission, was more than 849 million. Together with Klondike Adventures by Vizor, Township makes up 40% of the addressable tycoon market.

Township has received mostly positive customer and critical reviews. Since 2013, Township, as well as other Playrix's games had consistently been rated as one of the Top 15 or Top 50 grossing charts in more than 50 countries worldwide. Township was named one of the Best Mac Games of the Year in 2014. Additionally, the game has been listed multiple times in the Top-50 grossing games for iPad and the Top 100 for iPhone.

Criticism
Township, as with other games made by Playrix such as Homescapes, has been criticized for advertisements displaying misleading images and scenes that are not related to or otherwise misrepresent the core gameplay. However, according to the Australian Council on Children and the Media, no advertising and product placement was found inside the game itself.

References

External links 
 Official website

2012 video games
Android (operating system) games
Facebook games
False advertising
Free-to-play video games
IOS games
MacOS games
Playrix games
Video games developed in Russia